Paul Capdeville and Marcel Felder were the defending champions, but they lost in the quarterfinals to Federico Delbonis and Diego Junqueira.
Marcelo Demoliner and João Souza defeated Delbonis and Junqueira 7–5, 6–1 in the final to win the title.

Seeds

Draw

Draw

External links
Main Draw

Cachantun Cup - Singles
2013 - Doubles